Charles Ernest Chadsey (October 15, 1870 – April 9, 1930) was an American educator and school administrator. He served as superintendent of city schools in Chicago, Detroit, and Denver, and Durango.

Early life
Chadsey was in Nebraska City, Nebraska, to Frankin and Marie Barnum Chadsey. He graduated from Stanford University in 1892 and from Columbia University in 1894, receiving a  Ph.D in philosophy from the latter.

Career
Chadsey was considered a very prominent American educator.  In his obituary, his hometown paper, the Nebraska Daily News-Press, described him as having been, "one of the best known as brilliant young men of his era". In the April 20, 1922 issue of The Daily Illini, (the student newspaper of the University of Illinois, where Chadsey was working at the time) an article about Chadsey and his career was published praising his accomplishments, character, and the high regard in which students and faculty held him. The article declared that, "it was in the positions of superintendent of public schools in Denver, Detroit and Chicago that he proved himself to be the most able man in his line in the country" and considered by many to have been "The foremost school superintendent of the United States."

Chadsey was a member of the National Educational Association and its Educational Council where he served as president of the Department of Superintendence in 1911 and 1912. His fraternal organization affiliations were Phi Delta Theta and Phi Beta Kappa. He was also the author of several books and numerous educational magazine articles.

Chadsey additionally served as a lecturer at the University of Colorado and the University of Wisconsin. He also was a writer. He wrote elementary school readers and arithmetics, an historical tract on the Reconstruction era of American history, and articles in educational magazines.

Durango and Denver public schools
Chase began his teaching career working in a high school in Durango, Colorado. He came to serve as the district's superintendent. He, thereafter, spent five years as superintendent of Denver Public Schools. He resigned his job in Denver in 1912 in order to serve as superintendent in Detroit.

Superintendent of Detroit Public Schools
After serving five years as superintendent in Denver, Chadsey was appointed superintendent of Detroit Public Schools at an August 9, 1912 meeting of the Detroit Board of Education after the board had voted to end Wales C. Martindale's fifteen years as superintendent. Chadsey was voted in by 10–1, with a single member of the board instead voting for Dubuque, Iowa school superintendent James H. Harris. No board members that had opposed Martindale's ouster were in attendance, in an apparent failed effort at preventing a quorum. Harris had previously been favored for the job by the members of the board in attendance until Chadsey appeared before the board that night to personally apply for the job.

In Detroit, his methods attracted national interest.

Superintendent of Chicago Public Schools
In 1919, after the death of superintendent of Chicago Public Schools John Shoop, Chadsey was appointed superintendent. He left his post as superintendent of schools for Detroit to assume the role of Chicago's superintendent in March. The Chicago Board of Education had hired Chadsey with an unprecedented $18,000 annual salary. This very large salary attracted significant public discussion.

On April 2, less than month after Chadsey had started in the position, mayor William Hale Thompson asked that he resign. Thompson had publicly taken issue with Chadsey having not been hired from within the ranks of the school district, remarking, 

In late April 1919, being reelected mayor in the Chicago mayoral election earlier that month, Thompson had the majority of Board of Education that was aligned with him strip Chadsey of his powers and duties and replaced him with a "successor". Thompson also had the Chicago police lock Chadsey out of his office at the headquarters building of the school board after Chadsey refused to cooperate. Supporters of Chadsey brought about quo warranto proceedings seeking to compel his reinstatement by the Board of Education. On November 9, 1919, Circuit Court of Cook County Judge Kickham Scanlan ordered Mortenson removed and Chadsey reinstated with his authority as superintendent. However, Chadsey resigned on November 29, 1919, complaining that the Chicago Board of Education had refused to cooperate with his leadership as the school district's superintendent, and declaring that he did not intend to act as a figurehead superintendent. He only been able to act as superintendent for mere weeks of his tenure due to the actions of Thompson and the Board of Education. Some members of the Board of Education were ultimately convicted of conspiracy for Chadsey's ouster and were sentenced by a judge in the Circuit Court of Cook County.

Later career
After leaving Chicago Public Schools, Chadsey taught at the University of Chicago. His career ended at University of Illinois College of Education at Urbana-Champaign where he served as dean until his death at age 59.

Personal life and death
Chadsey married Callie Worth Price of Durango in 1897. They had one son, Charles Prince Chadsey. On April 9, 1930, at the age of 59, Chadsey died in Urbana, Illinois of a heart attack which came following two days of illness. He was survived by both his wife and son.

Works
Chadsey, Charles E. The Struggle Between President Johnson and Congress Over Reconstruction (1897)
Chadsey, Charles E. America in the making: From wilderness to world power (1928)

See also
Marquis, Albert Nelson. The Book of Detroiters: A Biographical Dictionary Of Leading Living Men Of The City of Detroit (1908) 2nd Edition (1914)

References

External links
 
 Genealogical Record; Charles E. Chadsey
 University Library Digital Newspaper Collection; University of Illinois at Urbana-Champaign	
Biographies - Wayne County, Michigan

1870 births
1930 deaths
American educational theorists
American Congregationalists
Columbia Graduate School of Arts and Sciences alumni
Stanford University alumni
People from Nebraska City, Nebraska
Superintendents of Chicago Public Schools
Superintendents of Detroit Public Schools Community District
School superintendents in Colorado